The 14th Karnataka Legislative Assembly was constituted after the Karnataka Legislative Assembly elections in 2013. 224 constituencies went to the polls on May 5; the votes were counted on May 8; and the results were announced on May 11.

Members 
Source.

Sources: Election Commission of India

Governor 
 Hansraj Bhardwaj (24 June 2009 – 29 June 2014)
 Konijeti Rosaiah (29 June 2014 – 31 August 2014)
 Vajubhai Rudabhai Vala (1 September 2014 – 10 July 2021)

Speaker 
Kagodu Thimmappa, INC from 31 May 2013 – 19 June 2016
K. B. Koliwad, INC from 5 July 2016 – 18 May 2018

Deputy Speaker 
N.H SHIVSHANKAR REDDY

Leader of the House

Legislative Assembly 
Siddaramaiah (Chief Minister), INC from 13 May 2013 – 15 May 2018

Legislative Council

Deputy Leader of the House (Deputy Chief Minister)

Legislative Assembly

Legislative Council

Leader of the Opposition 
 H.D. Kumarswamy, JD(S) from 31 May 2013 – 22 January 2014
 Jagadish Shettar, BJP from 23 January 2014 – 17 May 2018

Council of Ministers

Committees

Sessions

See also 
 2013 Karnataka Legislative Assembly election
 Siddaramaiah ministry
 Karnataka Legislative Assembly

References 

 
Karnataka Legislative Assembly
Karnataka MLAs 2013–2018
2013 establishments in Karnataka